The Solenogastres (less often referred to as Neomeniomorpha), common name the solenogasters, are one class of small, worm-like, shell-less molluscs (Aplacophora), the other class being the Caudofoveata (Chaetodermomorpha). 

Some recent literature, and recent molecular evidence, indicates that the Aplacophora may be polyphyletic, and therefore these taxonomists divide Solenogastres and Caudofoveata into separate classes.

Morphology
In contrast to all other molluscan classes, the Aplacophora have no shell, and are instead covered by aragonitic sclerites (calcareous spicules), which can be solid or hollow. These spicules can be arranged perpendicular to one another within the cuticle to form a skeleton, or can stick up to form a palisade, or can lie flat against the cuticle.

80% of solenogaster species have a radula, while in others it is secondarily lost. The radula may bear one or more teeth per row; where there is more than one tooth, there is no central radular tooth. The radula grows by dividing existing teeth in two, or by adding a new tooth at the centre of the radular row. The salivary glands are very elaborate, and are an important character for taxonomy. Next to the mouth they have a unique sense organ, the vestibulum.

The solenogastres do not have true ctenidia, although their gill-like structures resemble them.

Development
During development many Solenogastres are covered by a spiny scleritome comprising spines or scale-like plates; this has been likened to the halwaxiid scleritome.

Sclerites of Epimenia start out solid before developing a hollow stem that subsequently solidifies.

Ecology

Diet
Solenogasters feed on cnidaria and ctenophores, either sucking their bodily fluids or eating their tissue. They do not use their radulae to rasp prey, as other molluscs do.

Phylogeny
There is some uncertainty regarding the phylogenetic position of the solenogasters. Traditionally considered to be the most basal molluscan group and the sister group to the Caudofoveata, alternatives to both of these statements have been proposed on various lines of evidence. Indeed, some molecular datasets plot Solenogastres as an outgroup to Mollusca.

Families
 Acanthomeniidae Salvini-Plawen, 1978
 Amphimeniidae Salvini-Plawen, 1972
 Apodomeniidae Kocot, Todt, N. T. Mikkelsen & Halanych, 2019
 Dondersiidae Simroth, 1893
 Drepanomeniidae Salvini-Plawen, 1978
 Epimeniidae Salvini-Plawen, 1978
 Gymnomeniidae Odhner, 1920
 Hemimeniidae Salvini-Plawen, 1978
 Heteroherpiidae Salvini-Plawen, 1978
 Imeroherpiidae Salvini-Plawen, 1978
 Lepidomeniidae Pruvot, 1902
 Macellomeniidae Salvini-Plawen, 1978
 Meiomeniidae Salvini-Plawen, 1985
 Neomeniidae Ihering, 1876
 Notomeniidae Salvini-Plawen, 2004
 Phyllomeniidae Salvini-Plawen, 1978
 Proneomeniidae Mitchell, 1892
 Pruvotinidae Heath, 1911
 Rhipidoherpiidae Salvini-Plawen, 1978
 Rhopalomeniidae Salvini-Plawen, 1978
 Sandalomeniidae Salvini-Plawen, 1978
 Simrothiellidae Salvini-Plawen, 1978
 Strophomeniidae Salvini-Plawen, 1978
 Syngenoherpiidae Salvini-Plawen, 1978
Unassigned in Solenogastres
 Pholidoherpia Salvini-Plawen, 1978
 Rhabdoherpia Salvini-Plawen, 1978
Synonyms
 Superorder Aplotegmentaria (not monophyletic)
 Myzomeniidae Thiele, 1894: synonym of Dondersiidae Simroth, 1893 
 Superorder Pachytegmentaria (not monophyletic)
 Parameniidae Simroth, 1893: synonym of Pruvotinidae Heath, 1911 (invalid: type genus a junior homonym)
 Pararrhopaliidae Salvini-Plawen, 1972: synonym of Pruvotinidae Heath, 1911 
 Perimeniidae Nierstrasz, 1908: synonym of Pruvotinidae Heath, 1911
 Proneomenidae Mitchell, 1892: synonym of Proneomeniidae Mitchell, 1892
 Pruvotiniidae Heath, 1911: synonym of Pruvotinidae Heath, 1911 (incorrect original spelling)
 Solenopodidae Koren & Danielssen, 1877: synonym of Neomeniidae Ihering, 1876 
 Wireniidae Salvini-Plawen, 1978: synonym of Gymnomeniidae Odhner, 1920

References

Further reading
 

 
Mollusc classes